Ana Silva may refer to:

 Ana Carolina da Silva (born 1991), Brazilian volleyball player (part of the national team since 2014)
 Ana Beatriz Silva Correia (born 1992), Brazilian volleyball player (part of the national team 2010)
 Ana Cláudia da Silva Ramos (born 1961), Brazilian volleyball player (part of the national team 1986–1989)
 Ana Claudia Lemos Silva (born 1988), Brazilian track and field athlete
 Ana Cláudia Silva (Paralympian) (born 1987), Brazilian para-athlete
 Ana Cláudia Silva (gymnast) (born 1992), Brazilian artistic gymnast

See also
Ana da Silva, founding member of The Raincoats